Sena is a genus of moths belonging to the family Lasiocampidae.

The species of this genus are found in Africa.

Species:

Sena augustasi 
Sena breyeri 
Sena cardinalli 
Sena cuneata 
Sena donaldsoni 
Sena levenna 
Sena mendax 
Sena meyi 
Sena oberthueri 
Sena oberthuri 
Sena parva 
Sena poecila 
Sena prompta 
Sena proxima 
Sena punctulata 
Sena quirimbo 
Sena scotti 
Sena sikarama 
Sena strigifascia 
Sena zolotuhini

References

Lasiocampidae
Moth genera